Flaki or flaczki is a traditional Polish tripe stew. It is one of the many Polish soups, which represent an important part of Polish cuisine. Along with bigos, żurek, and pierogi, it is one of the most notable specialities in Polish cuisine. Its name is derived from its main ingredient: thin, cleaned strips of beef tripe (in   - which can also be literally translated to "guts").

Etymology 
Croatian  is a cognate.

History 

Flaki has been consumed on Polish territory since at least the 14th century. It is known to have been one of the favorite dishes of King Władysław II Jagiełło.

Preparation and serving 
The method of preparation may vary slightly depending on the region. Some common ingredients include beef tripe, beef, bay leaf, allspice, parsley, carrot, beef broth, and spices to taste, including salt, black pepper, nutmeg, sweet paprika, and marjoram. Ready-made convenience-type equivalents of the labor-intensive flaczki are available. Sometimes pork tripe can be used instead of the beef tripe especially in the ready-made versions of the dish sold in Poland.

Tomato concentrate is sometimes added to flaki, and some may cook the tripe without a roux. A popular addition to improve the 'nobleness' is the addition of meatballs, which are often found in a regional variant known as 'flaki po warszawsku' (Warsaw-style flaki). Ready-made flaki in cans or jars are widely available in grocery stores throughout Poland which also include "Flaki po Zamojsku" (Zamość-style Flaki). A variant of flaczki, in which fowl stomach is used instead of cow's, is also known and called ‘flaki drobiowe’ (poultry flaki). The soup is traditionally served during Polish weddings—as one of the "hot meals". Flaki is eaten with fresh bread, usually with bread roll.

See also 
 İşkembe çorbası
 Menudo
 Sopa de mondongo
 Rosół
 Tripes à la mode de Caen
 Callos

References 

Beef dishes
Polish soups
Stews
National dishes
Offal dishes